Wavell was an electoral district of the Legislative Assembly in the Australian state of Queensland from 1960 to 1986.

The district was based in the northern suburbs of Brisbane.

Members for Wavell

Election results

See also
 Electoral districts of Queensland
 Members of the Queensland Legislative Assembly by year
 :Category:Members of the Queensland Legislative Assembly by name

References

Former electoral districts of Queensland